The Jordanian Ambassador in Paris is the representative of the government in Amman (Jordan) to the government of France and is concurrently accredited to UNESCO, the Holy See and the government in Lisbon.

List of representatives

.

References 

Journal officiel de la République française:

 
France
Jordan